Lumber is wood that has been processed into uniform and useful sizes (dimensional lumber), including beams and planks or boards. Lumber is mainly used for construction framing, as well as finishing (floors, wall panels, window frames). Lumber has many uses beyond home building. Lumber is sometimes referred to as timber as an archaic term and still in England, while in most parts of the world (especially the United States and Canada) the term timber refers specifically to unprocessed wood fiber, such as cut logs or standing trees that have yet to be cut.

Lumber may be supplied either rough-sawn, or surfaced on one or more of its faces. Beside pulpwood, rough lumber is the raw material for furniture-making, and manufacture of other items requiring cutting and shaping. It is available in many species, including hardwoods and softwoods, such as white pine and red pine, because of their low cost.

Finished lumber is supplied in standard sizes, mostly for the construction industry – primarily softwood, from coniferous species, including pine, fir and spruce (collectively spruce-pine-fir), cedar, and hemlock, but also some hardwood, for high-grade flooring. It is more commonly made from softwood than hardwoods, and 80% of lumber comes from softwood.

Terminology

In the United States and Canada, milled boards are called lumber, while timber describes standing or felled trees.

In contrast, in Britain, and some other Commonwealth nations and Ireland, the term timber is used in both senses. (In the UK, the word lumber is rarely used in relation to wood and has several other meanings.)

Re-manufactured lumber

Re-manufactured lumber is the result of secondary or tertiary processing of previously milled lumber. Specifically, it refers to lumber cut for industrial or wood-packaging use. Lumber is cut by ripsaw or resaw to create dimensions that are not usually processed by a primary sawmill.

Re-sawing is the splitting of  hardwood or softwood lumber into two or more thinner pieces of full-length boards. For example, splitting a  2×4 into two 1×4s of the same length is considered re-sawing.

Plastic lumber

Structural lumber may also be produced from recycled plastic and new plastic stock. Its introduction has been strongly opposed by the forestry industry. Blending fiberglass in plastic lumber enhances its strength, durability, and fire resistance. Plastic fiberglass structural lumber can have a "class 1 flame spread rating of 25 or less, when tested in accordance with ASTM standard E 84," which means it burns more slowly than almost all treated wood lumber.

History
The basic understanding of lumber, or “sawn planks,” came about in North America in the seventeenth century.
Lumber is the most common and widely used method of sawing logs. Plain sawn lumber is produced by making the first cut on a tangent to the circumference of the log. Each additional cut is then made parallel to one before. This method produces the widest possible boards with the least amount of log waste.

Lumber manufacturing globally is determined by the preferred style of building; areas with a "wood building culture" (homes were built from wood rather than other materials like brick) are the countries with significant sawmilling industries. Historical wood-frame home building regions are: Europe, North America, China. Different areas of the world are recognized as significant timber suppliers; however, these areas (Indonesia, Sarawak, New Guinea, etc.) are exporters of raw logs and do not have a significant domestic lumber producing industry.

The largest lumber manufacturing regions in the world are: China (18%); United States (17%); Canada (10%); Russia (9%); Germany (5%); Sweden (4%).

In early periods of society to make wood for building, the trunks of trees were split with wedges into as many and as thin pieces as possible. If it was necessary to have them still thinner, they were hewn, by some sharp instrument, on both sides, to the proper size.This simple but wasteful manner of making boards is still continued in some places.

Otherwise, logs were sawn using a two-person whipsaw, or pit-saw, using saddleblocks to hold the log, and a pit for the pitman who worked below.

In 1420 the island of Madeira an archipelago comprising four islands off the northwest coast of Africa and an autonomous region of Portugal was discovered. King Henry VI sent settlers to Madeira and ordered sawmills to be erected for the purpose of cutting the various species of excellent timber with which the island abounded. About 1427, the first sawmill in Germany was built.

Cornelis Corneliszoon (or Krelis Lootjes) was a Dutch windmill owner from Uitgeest who invented the first mechanical sawmill, which was wind-powered, on December 15, 1593. This made the conversion of log timber into planks 30 times faster than previously.

The circular saw, as used in modern sawmills, was invented by an Englishman named Miller in 1777. It was not until the nineteenth century, however, that it was generally applied, and its great work belongs to that period. The first insertable teeth for this saw were invented by W. Kendal, an American, in 1826.

Logging in the American colonies began in 1607 when the Jamestown settlers cut timber to build the first settlement in the new world. America's first sawmill was built at the Falls of Piscatauqua, on the line between the Province of Maine and the Province of New Hampshire, in 1634. Unauthenticated records, however, claim that as early as 1633 several mills were operating in New Netherland.

The American colonies were essential to England in the role of supplier of lumber for the British fleet. By the 1790s New England was exporting 36 million feet of pine boards and at least 300 ship masts per year to the British Empire. The timber supply began to dwindle at the start of the twentieth century due to significant harvest volumes, so the logging industry was forced to seek timber elsewhere; hence, the expansion into the American West.

Conversion of wood logs

Logs are converted into lumber by being sawn, hewn, or split. Sawing with a rip saw is the most common method, because sawing allows logs of lower quality, with irregular grain and large knots, to be used and is more economical. There are various types of sawing:
 Plain sawn (flat sawn, through and through, bastard sawn) – A log sawn through without adjusting the position of the log and the grain runs across the width of the boards.
 Quarter sawn and rift sawn – These terms have been confused in history but generally mean lumber sawn so the annual rings are reasonably perpendicular to the sides (not edges) of the lumber.
 Boxed heart – The pith remains within the timber, post or beam, with some allowance for exposure.
 Heart center – the center core of a log.
 Free of heart center (FOHC) – A side-cut timber, post or beam without any pith.
 Free of knots (FOK) – No knots are present.

Dimensional lumber

Dimensional lumber is lumber that is cut to standardized width and depth, often specified in millimetres or inches. Carpenters extensively use dimensional lumber in framing wooden buildings. Common sizes include 2×4 (pictured) (also two-by-four and other variants, such as four-by-two in Australia, New Zealand, and the UK), 2×6, and 4×4. The length of a board is usually specified separately from the width and depth. It is thus possible to find 2×4s that are four, eight, and twelve feet in length. For wall framing, precut "stud" lengths are available, and are commonly used.

North American softwoods
The length of a unit of dimensional lumber is limited by the height and girth of the tree it is milled from. Engineered wood products, manufactured by binding the strands, particles, fibers, or veneers of wood, together with adhesives, to form composite materials, offer more flexibility and greater structural strength than typical wood building materials.

Pre-cut studs save a framer much time, because they are pre-cut by the manufacturer for use in 8-, 9-, and 10-foot ceiling applications, which means the manufacturer has removed a few inches or centimetres of the piece to allow for the sill plate and the double top plate with no additional sizing necessary.

In the Americas, two-bys (2×4s, 2×6s, 2×8s, 2×10s, and 2×12s), named for traditional board thickness in inches, along with the 4×4, are common lumber sizes used in modern construction. They are the basic building blocks for such common structures as balloon-frame or platform-frame housing. Dimensional lumber made from softwood is typically used for construction, while hardwood boards are more commonly used for making cabinets or furniture.

Lumber's nominal dimensions are larger than the actual standard dimensions of finished lumber. Historically, the nominal dimensions were the size of the green (not dried), rough (unfinished) boards that eventually became smaller finished lumber through drying and planing (to smooth the wood). Today, the standards specify the final finished dimensions and the mill cuts the logs to whatever size it needs to achieve those final dimensions. Typically, that rough cut is smaller than the nominal dimensions because modern technology makes it possible to use the logs more efficiently. For example, a "2×4" board historically started out as a green, rough board actually . After drying and planing, it would be smaller by a nonstandard amount. Today, a "2×4" board starts out as something smaller than 2 inches by 4 inches and not specified by standards, and after drying and planing is minimally .

As previously noted, less wood is needed to produce a given finished size than when standards called for the green lumber to be the full nominal dimension. However, even the dimensions for finished lumber of a given nominal size have changed over time. In 1928, that was reduced by 4%, and yet again by 4% in 1956. In 1961, at a meeting in Scottsdale, Arizona, the Committee on Grade Simplification and Standardization agreed to what is now the current U.S. standard: in part, the dressed size of a 1-inch (nominal) board was fixed at  inch; while the dressed size of 2 inch (nominal) lumber was reduced from  inch to the current  inch.

Dimensional lumber is available in green, unfinished state, and for that kind of lumber, the nominal dimensions are the actual dimensions.

Grades and standards

Individual pieces of lumber exhibit a wide range in quality and appearance with respect to knots, slope of grain, shakes and other natural characteristics. Therefore, they vary considerably in strength, utility, and value.

The move to set national standards for lumber in the United States began with the publication of the American Lumber Standard in 1924, which set specifications for lumber dimensions, grade, and moisture content; it also developed inspection and accreditation programs. These standards have changed over the years to meet the changing needs of manufacturers and distributors, with the goal of keeping lumber competitive with other construction products. Current standards are set by the American Lumber Standard Committee, appointed by the U.S. Secretary of Commerce.

Design values for most species and grades of visually graded structural products are determined in accordance with ASTM standards, which consider the effect of strength reducing characteristics, load duration, safety, and other influencing factors. The applicable standards are based on results of tests conducted in cooperation with the USDA Forest Products Laboratory. Design Values for Wood Construction, which is a supplement to the ANSI/AF&PA National Design Specification® for Wood Construction, provides these lumber design values, which are recognized by the model building codes.

Canada has grading rules that maintain a standard among mills manufacturing similar woods to assure customers of uniform quality. Grades standardize the quality of lumber at different levels and are based on moisture content, size, and manufacture at the time of grading, shipping, and unloading by the buyer. The National Lumber Grades Authority (NLGA) is responsible for writing, interpreting and maintaining Canadian lumber grading rules and standards. The Canadian Lumber Standards Accreditation Board (CLSAB) monitors the quality of Canada's lumber grading and identification system.

Attempts to maintain lumber quality over time have been challenged by historical changes in the timber resources of the United States – from the slow-growing virgin forests common over a century ago to the fast-growing plantations now common in today's commercial forests. Resulting declines in lumber quality have been of concern to both the lumber industry and consumers and have caused increased use of alternative construction products.

Machine stress-rated and machine-evaluated lumber are readily available for end-uses where high strength is critical, such as trusses, rafters, laminating stock, I-beams and web joints. Machine grading measures a characteristic such as stiffness or density that correlates with the structural properties of interest, such as bending strength. The result is a more precise understanding of the strength of each piece of lumber than is possible with visually graded lumber, which allows designers to use full-design strength and avoid overbuilding.

In Europe, strength grading of rectangular sawn lumber/timber (both softwood and hardwood) is done according to EN-14081  and commonly sorted into classes defined by EN-338. For softwoods, the common classes are (in increasing strength) C16, C18, C24, and C30. There are also classes specifically for hardwoods and those in most common use (in increasing strength) are D24, D30, D40, D50, D60, and D70. For these classes, the number refers to the required 5th percentile bending strength in newtons per square millimetre. There are other strength classes, including T-classes based on tension intended for use in glulam.
 C14, used for scaffolding and formwork
 C16 and C24, general construction
 C30, prefab roof trusses and where design requires somewhat stronger joists than C24 can offer. TR26 is also a common trussed rafter strength class in long standing use in the UK.
 C40, usually seen in glulam

Grading rules for African and South American sawn lumber have been developed by ATIBT according to the rules of the Sciages Avivés Tropicaux Africains (SATA) and is based on clear cuttings – established by the percentage of the clear surface.

North American hardwoods
In North America, market practices for dimensional lumber made from hardwoods varies significantly from the regularized standardized 'dimension lumber' sizes used for sales and specification of softwoods – hardwood boards are often sold totally rough cut, or machine planed only on the two (broader) face sides. When hardwood boards are also supplied with planed faces, it is usually both by random widths of a specified thickness (normally matching milling of softwood dimensional lumbers) and somewhat random lengths. But besides those older (traditional and normal) situations, in recent years some product lines have been widened to also market boards in standard stock sizes; these usually retail in big-box stores and using only a relatively small set of specified lengths; in all cases hardwoods are sold to the consumer by the board-foot, whereas that measure is not used for softwoods at the retailer (to the cognizance of the buyer).

Also in North America, hardwood lumber is commonly sold in a "quarter" system, when referring to thickness; 4/4 (four quarter) refers to a  board, 8/4 (eight quarter) is a  board, etc.
The "quarter" system of reference is a traditional North American lumber industry nomenclature used specifically to indicate the thickness of rough sawn hardwood lumber.

In rough-sawn lumber it immediately clarifies that the lumber is not yet milled, avoiding confusion with milled dimension lumber which is measured as actual thickness after machining. Examples – -inch, 19 mm, or 1x.
In recent years architects, designers, and builders have begun to use the "quarter" system in specifications as a vogue of insider knowledge, though the materials being specified are finished lumber, thus conflating the separate systems and causing confusion.

Hardwoods cut for furniture are cut in the fall and winter, after the sap has stopped running in the trees. If hardwoods are cut in the spring or summer the sap ruins the natural color of the lumber and decreases the value of the wood for furniture.

Engineered lumber

Engineered lumber is lumber created by a manufacturer and designed for a certain structural purpose. The main categories of engineered lumber are:
They function as beams to provide support over large spans, such as removed support walls and garage door openings, places where dimensional lumber is insufficient, and also in areas where a heavy load is bearing from a floor, wall or roof above on a somewhat short span where dimensional lumber is impractical. This type of lumber is compromised if it is altered by holes or notches anywhere within the span or at the ends, but nails can be driven into it wherever necessary to anchor the beam or to add hangers for I-joists or dimensional lumber joists that terminate at an LVL beam.
 Wooden I-joists – sometimes called "TJI", "Trus Joists" or "BCI", all of which are brands of wooden I-joists, they are used for floor joists on upper floors and also in first floor conventional foundation construction on piers as opposed to slab floor construction. They are engineered for long spans and are doubled up in places where a wall will be aligned over them, and sometimes tripled where heavy roof-loaded support walls are placed above them. They consist of a top and bottom chord or flange made from dimensional lumber with a webbing in-between made from oriented strand board (OSB) (or, latterly, steel mesh forms which allow passage of services without cutting). The webbing can be removed up to certain sizes or shapes according to the manufacturer's or engineer's specifications, but for small holes, wooden I-joists come with "knockouts", which are perforated, pre-cut areas where holes can be made easily, typically without engineering approval. When large holes are needed, they can typically be made in the webbing only and only in the center third of the span; the top and bottom chords lose their integrity if cut. Sizes and shapes of the hole, and typically the placing of a hole itself, must be approved by an engineer prior to the cutting of the hole and in many areas, a sheet showing the calculations made by the engineer must be provided to the building inspection authorities before the hole will be approved. Some I-joists are made with W-style webbing like a truss to eliminate cutting and to allow ductwork to pass through.
Finger-jointing also is predominant in precut wall studs. It is also an affordable alternative for non-structural hardwood that will be painted (staining would leave the finger-joints visible). Care is taken during construction to avoid nailing directly into a glued joint as stud breakage can occur.
 Glulam beams – created from 2×4 or 2×6 stock by gluing the faces together to create beams such as 4×12 or 6×16. As such, a beam acts as one larger piece of lumber – thus eliminating the need to harvest larger, older trees for the same size beam.
 Manufactured trusses – trusses are used in home construction as a pre-fabricated replacement for roof rafters and ceiling joists (stick-framing). It is seen as an easier installation and a better solution for supporting roofs than the use of dimensional lumber's struts and purlins as bracing. In the southern U.S. and elsewhere, stick-framing with dimensional lumber roof support is still predominant. The main drawbacks of trusses are reduced attic space, time required for engineering and ordering, and a cost higher than the dimensional lumber needed if the same project were conventionally framed. The advantages are significantly reduced labor costs (installation is faster than conventional framing), consistency, and overall schedule savings.

Various pieces and cuts

 Square and rectangular forms: plank, slat, batten, board, lath, strapping (typically ), cant (A partially sawn log such as sawn on two sides or squared to a large size and later resawn into lumber. A flitch is a type of cant with wane on one or both sides). Various pieces are also known by their uses such as post, beam, (girt), stud, rafter, joist, sill plate, wall plate.
Rod forms: pole, (dowel), stick (staff, baton)

Timber piles
In the United States, pilings are mainly cut from southern yellow pines and Douglas firs. Treated pilings are available in chromated copper arsenate retentions of  if treatment is required.

Historical Chinese construction
Under the prescription of the Method of Construction (營造法式) issued by the Song dynasty government in the early twelfth century, timbers were standardized to eight cross-sectional dimensions. Regardless of the actual dimensions of the timber, the ratio between width and height was maintained at 1:1.5. Units are in Song dynasty inches (31.2 mm).

Timber smaller than the 8th class were called "unclassed" (等外). The width of a timber is referred to as one "timber" (材), and the dimensions of other structural components were quoted in multiples of "timber"; thus, as the width of the actual timber varied, the dimensions of other components were easily calculated, without resorting to specific figures for each scale. The dimensions of timbers in similar applications show a gradual diminution from the Sui dynasty (580–618) to the modern era; a 1st class timber during the Sui was reconstructed as 15×10 (Sui dynasty inches, or 29.4 mm).

Defects in lumber

Defects occurring in lumber are grouped into the following four divisions:

Conversion
During the process of converting timber to commercial forms of lumber the following defects may occur:
 Chip mark: this defect is indicated by the marks or signs placed by chips on the finished surface of timber
 Diagonal grain: improper sawing of timber
 Torn grain: when a small dent is made on the finished surface due to falling of some tool
 Wane: presence of original rounded surface in the finished product

Defects due to fungi and animals
Fungi attack wood (both timber and lumber) when these conditions are all present:
 The wood moisture content is above 25% on a dry-weight basis
 The environment is sufficiently warm
 Oxygen (O2) is present

Wood with less than 25% moisture (dry weight basis) can remain free of decay for centuries. Similarly, wood submerged in water may not be attacked by fungi if the amount of oxygen is inadequate.

Fungi lumber/timber defects:
 Blue stain
 Brown rot
 Dry rot
 Heart rot
 Sap stain
 Wet rot
 White rot

Following are the insects and molluscs which are usually responsible for the decay of timber/lumber:
 Woodboring beetles
 Marine borers (Barnea similis)
 Teredos (Teredo navalis)
 Termites
 Carpenter ants
 Carpenter bees

Natural forces

There are two main natural forces responsible for causing defects in timber and lumber: abnormal growth and rupture of tissues. Rupture of tissue includes cracks or splits in the wood called "shakes". "Ring shake", "wind shake", or "ring failure" is when the wood grain separates around the growth rings either while standing or during felling. Shakes may reduce the strength of a timber and the appearance thus reduce lumber grade and may capture moisture, promoting decay. Eastern hemlock is known for having ring shake. A "check" is a crack on the surface of the wood caused by the outside of a timber shrinking as it seasons. Checks may extend to the pith and follow the grain. Like shakes, checks can hold water promoting rot. A "split" goes all the way through a timber. Checks and splits occur more frequently at the ends of lumber because of the more rapid drying in these locations.

Seasoning
The seasoning of lumber is typically either kiln- or air-dried. Defects due to seasoning are the main cause of splits, bowing and honeycombing. Seasoning is the process of drying timber to remove the bound moisture contained in the walls of the wood cells to produce seasoned timber.

Durability and service life
Under proper conditions, wood provides excellent, lasting performance. However, it also faces several potential threats to service life, including fungal activity and insect damage – which can be avoided in numerous ways. Section 2304.11 of the International Building Code addresses protection against decay and termites. This section provides requirements for non-residential construction applications, such as wood used above ground (e.g., for framing, decks, stairs, etc.), as well as other applications.

There are four recommended methods to protect wood-frame structures against durability hazards and thus provide maximum service life for the building. All require proper design and construction:
 Controlling moisture using design techniques to avoid decay
 Providing effective control of termites and other insects
 Using durable materials such as pressure-treated or naturally durable species of wood where appropriate
 Providing quality assurance during design and construction and throughout the building's service life using appropriate maintenance practices

Moisture control
Wood is a hygroscopic material, which means it naturally absorbs and releases water to balance its internal moisture content with the surrounding environment. The moisture content of wood is measured by the weight of water as a percentage of the oven-dry weight of the wood fiber. The key to controlling decay is controlling moisture. Once decay fungi are established, the minimum moisture content for decay to propagate is 22 to 24 percent, so building experts recommend 19 percent as the maximum safe moisture content for untreated wood in service. Water by itself does not harm the wood, but rather, wood with consistently high moisture content enables fungal organisms to grow.

The primary objective when addressing moisture loads is to keep water from entering the building envelope in the first place and to balance the moisture content within the building itself. Moisture control by means of accepted design and construction details is a simple and practical method of protecting a wood-frame building against decay. For applications with a high risk of staying wet, designers specify durable materials such as naturally decay-resistant species or wood that has been treated with preservatives. Cladding, shingles, sill plates and exposed timbers or glulam beams are examples of potential applications for treated wood.

Controlling termites and other insects
For buildings in termite zones, basic protection practices addressed in current building codes include (but are not limited to) the following:

 Grading the building site away from the foundation to provide proper drainage
 Covering exposed ground in any crawl spaces with 6-mil polyethylene film and maintaining at least  of clearance between the ground and the bottom of framing members above (12 inches to beams or girders, 18 inches to joists or plank flooring members)
 Supporting post columns by concrete piers so that there is at least  of clear space between the wood and exposed earth
 Installing wood framing and sheathing in exterior walls at least eight inches above exposed earth; locating siding at least six inches from the finished grade
 Where appropriate, ventilating crawl spaces according to local building codes
 Removing building material scraps from the job site before backfilling.
 If allowed by local regulation, treating the soil around the foundation with an approved termiticide to provide protection against subterranean termites

Preservatives

To avoid decay and termite infestation, untreated wood is separated from the ground and other sources of moisture. These separations are required by many building codes and are considered necessary to maintain wood elements in permanent structures at a safe moisture content for decay protection. When it is not possible to separate wood from the sources of moisture, designers often rely on preservative-treated wood.

Wood can be treated with a preservative that improves service life under severe conditions without altering its basic characteristics. It can also be pressure-impregnated with fire-retardant chemicals that improve its performance in a fire. One of the early treatments to "fireproof lumber", which retard fires, was developed in 1936 by the Protexol Corporation, in which lumber is heavily treated with salt.
Wood does not deteriorate simply because it gets wet. When wood breaks down, it is because an organism is eating it. Preservatives work by making the food source inedible to these organisms. Properly preservative-treated wood can have 5 to 10 times the service life of untreated wood. Preserved wood is used most often for railroad ties, utility poles, marine piles, decks, fences and other outdoor applications. Various treatment methods and types of chemicals are available, depending on the attributes required in the particular application and the level of protection needed.

There are two basic methods of treating: with and without pressure. Non-pressure methods are the application of preservatives by brushing, spraying, or dipping the piece to be treated. Deeper, more thorough penetration is achieved by driving the preservative into the wood cells with pressure. Various combinations of pressure and vacuum are used to force adequate levels of chemical into the wood. Pressure-treating preservatives consist of chemicals carried in a solvent.
Chromated copper arsenate, once the most commonly used wood preservative in North America began being phased out of most residential applications in 2004. Replacing it are amine copper quat and copper azole.

All wood preservatives used in the United States and Canada are registered and regularly re-examined for safety by the U.S. Environmental Protection Agency and Health Canada's Pest Management and Regulatory Agency, respectively.

Timber framing

Timber framing is a style of construction that uses heavier framing elements (larger posts and beams) than modern stick framing, which uses smaller standard dimensional lumber. The timbers are cut from log boles and squared with a saw, broadaxe or adze, and then joined together with joinery without nails. Modern timber framing has been growing in popularity in the United States since the 1970s.

Environmental effects of lumber
Green building minimizes the impact or "environmental footprint" of a building. Wood is a major building material that is renewable and replenishable in a continuous cycle. Studies show manufacturing wood uses less energy and results in less air and water pollution than steel and concrete. However, demand for lumber is blamed for deforestation.

Residual wood
The conversion from coal to biomass power is a growing trend in the United States.

The United Kingdom, Uzbekistan, Kazakhstan, Australia, Fiji, Madagascar, Mongolia, Russia, Denmark, Switzerland, and Eswatini governments all support an increased role for energy derived from biomass, which are organic materials available on a renewable basis and include residues and/or byproducts of the logging, saw milling and paper-making processes. In particular, they view it as a way to lower greenhouse gas emissions by reducing the consumption of oil and gas while supporting the growth of forestry, agriculture and rural economies. Studies by the U.S. government have found the country's combined forest and agriculture land resources have the power to sustainably supply more than one-third of its current petroleum consumption.

Biomass is already an important source of energy for the North American forest products industry. It is common for companies to have cogeneration facilities, also known as combined heat and power, which convert some of the biomass that results from wood and paper manufacturing to electrical and thermal energy in the form of steam. The electricity is used to, among other things, dry lumber and supply heat to the dryers used in paper-making.

Environmental impacts 
Lumber is a sustainable and environmentally friendly construction material that could replace traditional building materials (e.g. concrete and steel). Its structural performance, capacity to fixate CO2 and low energy demand during the manufacturing process make lumber an interesting material.

Substituting lumber for concrete or steel avoids the carbon emissions of those materials. Cement and concrete manufacture is responsible for around 8% of global GHG emissions while the iron and steel industry is responsible for another 5% (half a ton of CO2 is emitted to manufacture a ton of concrete; two tons of CO2  are emitted in the manufacture of a ton of steel).

Advantages of lumber:

 Fire performance: In the case of fire, the outer layer of mass timber will tend to char in a predictable way that effectively self-extinguishes and shields the interior, allowing it to retain structural integrity for several hours, even in an intense fire.
 Reduction of carbon emissions: Building materials and construction make up 11% of global greenhouse gas emissions. Though the exact amount will depend on tree species, forestry practices, transportation costs, and several other factors, that one cubic meter of lumber sequesters roughly one tonne of CO2.
 Natural insulation: lumber is a natural insulator which makes it particularly good for windows and doors.
 Less construction time, labor costs, and waste: it is easy to manufacture prefabricated lumber, from which pieces can be assembled simultaneously (with relatively little labor). This reduces material waste, avoids massive on-site inventory, and minimizes on-site disruption. According to the softwood lumber industry, “Mass timber buildings are roughly 25% faster to construct than concrete buildings and require 90% less construction traffic".

End-of-life 
An EPA study showed the typical end-of-life scenario for wood waste from municipal solid waste (MSW), wood packaging, and other miscellaneous wood products in the US. Based on the 2018 data, about 67% of wood waste was landfilled, 16% incinerated with energy recovery, and 17% recycled.

A 2020 study conducted by Edinburgh Napier University demonstrated the proportional waste stream of recovered lumber in the UK. The study showed that timber from municipal solid waste and packaging waste made up 13 and 26% of waste collected. Construction and demolition waste made up the biggest bulk of waste collectively at 52%, with the remaining 10% coming from industry.

In the circular economy 
The Ellen MacArthur Foundation defines the circular economy as “based on the principles of designing out waste and pollution, keeping products and materials in use, and regenerating natural systems.”

The circular economy can be considered as a model that aims to eliminate waste by targeting materials, and products at their maximum value of utility and time. In short, it is a whole new model of production and consumption that ensures sustainable development over time. It is related to the reuse of materials, components, and products over a longer life cycle.

Wood is among the most demanding materials, which makes it important to come up with a model of the circular economy. The lumber industry creates a lot of waste, especially in its manufacturing process. From log debarking to finished products, there are several stages of processing that generate a considerable volume of waste, which includes solid wood waste, harmful gases, and residual water. Therefore, it is important to identify and apply measures to reduce environmental contamination, giving a financial return to the industries (e.g., selling the waste to wood chippings manufacturers) and maintaining a healthy relationship between the environment and industries.

Wood waste can be recycled at its end of life to make new products. Recycled chips can be used to make wood panels, which is beneficial for both the environment and industry. Such practice reduces the use of virgin raw materials, eliminating emissions that would have otherwise been emitted in its manufacturing.

One of the studies conducted in Hong Kong was done using life-cycle assessment (LCA). The study aimed to assess and compare the environmental impacts of wood waste management from building construction activities using different alternative management scenarios in Hong Kong. Despite various advantages of lumber and its waste, the contribution to the study of the circular economy of lumber is still very small. Some areas where improvements can be made to improve the circularity of lumber is as follows:

 First, regulations to support recycled lumber use. For example, establishing grading standards and enforcing penalties for improper disposal, especially in sectors that produce big quantities of wood waste, such as the construction and demolition sector. 
 Second, creating a stronger supply force. This can be achieved by improving demolition protocol and technology and enhancing the secondary raw materials market through circular business models. 
 Third, increase demand by introducing incentives to the construction sector and new homeowners to use recycled lumber. This can be in the form of reduced taxes for the construction of the new build.

Secondary raw material 
The term secondary raw material denotes waste material that has been recycled and injected back into use as productive material. Lumber has a high potential to be used as a secondary raw material at various stages, as listed below:

Recovery of branches and leaves for use as fertilisers
Timber undergo multiple processing stages before lumber of desired shapes, size, and standards are achieved for commercial use. The process generates a lot of waste which in most cases is disregarded. But being an organic waste, the positive aspect of such waste is that it can be used as a fertiliser or to protect the soil in severe weather conditions.
Recovery of woodchips for thermal energy generation
Waste generated during the manufacturing of lumber products can be used to produce thermal energy. Lumber products after their end-of-life can be downcycled into chips and be used as biomass to produce thermal energy. It is beneficial for industries that need thermal energy.

Circular economy practices offer effective solutions concerning waste. It targets its unnecessary generation through waste reduction, reuse, and recycling. There is no clear explicit evidence of circular economy in the wood panel industry. However, based on the circular economy concept and its characteristics, there are opportunities present in the wood panel industry from the raw material extraction phase to its end-of-life. Therefore, there lies a gap yet to be explored.

See also 

 
 Cubic ton
 Deck (building)
 Engineered wood
 Hardwood timber production
 List of woods
 Logging
 Lumber room
 Lumberjack
 Non-timber forest product
 Recycling timber
 Table of Wood and Bamboo Mechanical and Agricultural Properties
 Timber treatment
 Wood economy
 Woodworking

Explanatory notes

References

Further reading

External links

 National Hardwood Lumber Association (Rules for Grading Hardwood Lumber – Inspector Training School)
 Timber Development Association of NSW – Australia
 TDA: Timber Decking Association – UK
 TRADA: Timber Research And Development Association
 The Forest Products Laboratory. U.S. main wood products research lab. Madison, WI (E)
 WCTE, World Conference on Timber Engineering　June 20–24, 2010, Riva del Garda, Trentino, Italy
 Forest Products data in Canada since 1990

Forestry
Timber industry
Wood products
Woodworking